Hibbertia furfuracea is a species of flowering plant in the family Dilleniaceae and is endemic to near-coastal areas of south-western Western Australia. It is an erect shrub with narrow egg-shaped leaves with the narrower end towards the base, and yellow flowers borne in upper leaf axils, with ten to twelve stamens all on one side of two carpels.

Description
There are from ten to twelve stamens arranged on one side of the two hairy, spherical carpels, each carpel with four ovules. Flowering occurs from July to December.

Taxonomy
This species was first formally described in 1817 by Augustin Pyramus de Candolle in his Regni Vegetabilis Systema Naturale and given the name Pleurandra furfuracea from an unpublished description by Robert Brown. In 1863, George Bentham changed the name to Hibbertia furfuracea in Flora Australiensis. The specific epithet (furfuracea) means "scurfy", referring to the branchlets and young leaves.

Distribution and habitat
Hibbertia furfuracea is widespread and common in near-coastal areas between Cape Naturaliste and the Donnelly River and between Broke in the D'Entrecasteaux National Park and the Waychinicup River, in the Esperance Plains, Jarrah Forest and Warren biogeographic regions of south-western Western Australia.

Conservation status
Hibbertia furfuracea is listed as "not threatened" by the Government of Western Australia Department of Parks and Wildlife,

References

furfuracea
Eudicots of Western Australia
Plants described in 1817
Taxa named by Augustin Pyramus de Candolle